Chupkotha is an original Bengali television series, originating as a feature-length film, that debuted 24 August 2018 on the OTT platform Hoichoi.

Plot 
Directed by Rick Basu, the horror story follows a missing child in the quiet town of Kurseong. An investigative journalist named Shivangi (Parno Mittra) is assigned to the case. The series also stars Shataf Figar and Mainak Banerjee. The second season debuted in April 2019. Mahi Singh, Sudip Mukherjee, Prasun Gain, Farhan Imroze, and Rajat Ganguly joined the cast.

Cast 
Parno Mittra
Shataf Figar
Prasun Gain 
Mainak Banerjee
Mahi Singh 
Sudip Mukherjee
Farhan Imroze
Rajat Ganguly

Season 1 (2018)
Season 1 consisted of the feature-length film.

Season 2 (2019)
In Season 2, Chupkotha was converted to a television series, with new five episodes.

Episodes

References

External links

Indian web series
2017 web series debuts
Bengali-language web series